is the second compilation album by the Japanese girl group Cute, released on November 21, 2012.

Background 
The  album is primarily a compilation of Cute's hit songs. The older songs were remixed with new vocal tracks, some were-arranged. The album also contains one new song, titled "Daisuki no Imi o Oshiete".

Release information 
The album was released in three versions: Regular Edition and Limited Editions A and B. The regular edition is CD-only, both limited editions include a DVD. All editions will include a randomly seeded trading card (of 5 types total).

Track listing

Charts

References

External links 
  
  
 
 

Cute (Japanese idol group) compilation albums
2012 greatest hits albums
Zetima compilation albums
Albums produced by Tsunku
2012 video albums
Music video compilation albums
Cute (Japanese idol group) video albums
Japanese-language compilation albums
Japanese-language video albums
Zetima video albums